I-185 may refer to:

Interstate 185 (Georgia), a spur to Columbus, Georgia
Interstate 185 (South Carolina), a spur in Greenville, South Carolina
Japanese submarine I-185
Polikarpov I-185, a Soviet fighter aircraft